Grădinari is a commune located in Giurgiu County, Muntenia, Romania. It is composed of three villages: Grădinari, Tântava and Zorile. It was the location of a residence for 250 abandoned children with physical and intellectual disabilities during the 1990s.

References

External links 

Communes in Giurgiu County
Localities in Muntenia